The 2014 Indian general election in Jharkhand were held for 14 seats in the state. The voting process was held in three phases on 10, 17 and 24 April 2014.

Result

|- align=center
!style="background-color:#E9E9E9" class="unsortable"|
!style="background-color:#E9E9E9" align=center|Political Party
!style="background-color:#E9E9E9" |Seats won
!style="background-color:#E9E9E9" |Seat change
|-
| 
|align="left"|Bharatiya Janata Party||12|| 4
|-
| 
|align="left"|Jharkhand Mukti Morcha||2||
|-
|
|align="left"|Total||14||
|}

List of elected MPs
Keys:

References

Indian general elections in Jharkhand
2010s in Jharkhand
2014 Indian general election by state or union territory